Nicholas Houghton Allen (30 August 1958 – 7 October 1984) was a New Zealand rugby union player. A first five-eighth, Allen represented Auckland and Counties at a provincial level. He played nine matches, including two tests, for the New Zealand national side, the All Blacks, in 1980. He died in Wollongong in 1984 from head injuries sustained in a club rugby match, and he is buried at Purewa Cemetery in Auckland.

References

1958 births
1984 deaths
Rugby union players from Auckland
People educated at Auckland Grammar School
University of Auckland alumni
New Zealand rugby union players
New Zealand international rugby union players
Auckland rugby union players
Counties Manukau rugby union players
Rugby union fly-halves
Sport deaths in Australia
Accidental deaths in New South Wales
Burials at Purewa Cemetery